Åke Pettersson can refer to:

 Åke Pettersson (Finnish footballer)
 Åke Pettersson (Swedish footballer)